Clissold is a surname. Notable people with the surname include:

Edward L. Clissold (died 1985), LDS leader
Stephen Clissold (1825–1898), English cricketer
Thomas Clissold, expedition cook 
Tim Clissold, financial author